The Handa Junior Masters was an international junior golf tournament on the Golf Australia at The Vines Resort & Country Club in Perth. It was founded in 2004. The tournament was previously known as the Mastercard Junior Masters.

Winner

References

External links
 Handa Junior Masters

Junior golf tournaments
Amateur golf tournaments in Australia
International Sports Promotion Society